Mary Elizabeth Hartman (December 23, 1943 – June 10, 1987) was an American actress of the stage and screen. She debuted in the popular 1965 film A Patch of Blue, playing a blind girl named Selina D'Arcy, opposite Sidney Poitier, a role for which she was nominated for an Academy Award for Best Actress and a Golden Globe Award for Best Actress, and won the Golden Globe Award for New Star of the Year.

She appeared in Francis Ford Coppola's You're a Big Boy Now as Barbara Darling, for which she was nominated for a second Golden Globe Award.

She also starred in Don Siegel's The Beguiled opposite Clint Eastwood and Geraldine Page, and in the 1973 film Walking Tall.

On stage, Hartman is remembered for her interpretations of Laura Wingfield in The Glass Menagerie, for which she won Ohio's "Actress of the Year" award, and Emily Webb in the 1969 Broadway production of Our Town. Hartman retired from acting in 1982 after portraying Mrs. Brisby in Don Bluth's first animated feature, The Secret of NIMH (1982).

Early life 
Mary Elizabeth Hartman was born December 23, 1943, in Youngstown, Ohio, the daughter of Claire (née Mullaly; 1918–1997) and B.C. Hartman (1914–1964). She had a sister, Janet, and a brother, William. She was a standout dramatic student at Boardman High School, where she graduated in 1961. She won a statewide award for best actress in a high school production for her performance as Laura in The Glass Menagerie. She performed in several productions at the Youngstown Playhouse during her youth, including A Clearing in the Woods by Arthur Laurents and Our Town. She attended Carnegie Mellon University in Pittsburgh, where she met her future husband, Gill Dennis, and spent her summers acting with the Kenley Players.

Hartman also performed at the Cleveland Playhouse in several productions, including The Madwoman of Chaillot and Bus Stop. She was encouraged to move to New York City and begin auditioning for plays there. In 1964, Hartman was signed to play the ingénue lead in the comedy Everybody Out, the Castle is Sinking, which was not a success, however her performance was again positively received, and film producers took notice.

Career 
In 1964, Hartman was screen-tested by Metro-Goldwyn-Mayer and Warner Brothers. In the early autumn of 1964, she was offered a leading role in A Patch of Blue, opposite Sidney Poitier and Shelley Winters. The role won widespread critical acclaim for Hartman, a fact proudly noted by the news media in her hometown. During this time, her father, who worked in construction, died. The role also won an Academy Award nomination for Best Actress for Hartman. At the time of her nomination in 1966, Elizabeth Hartman (who was 23 years old) was the youngest nominee ever in the Best Actress category. That same year, she received an achievement award from the National Association of Theatre Owners. Hartman also won a Golden Globe for New Star of the Year for her performance. In 1966, she starred as Laura opposite Mercedes McCambridge as Amanda in a production of The Glass Menagerie in Pittsburgh.

In January 1967, columnist Dorothy Manners reported that Hartman had been cast in the role of Neely O'Hara in the movie version of Valley of the Dolls, beating out some more famous Hollywood actresses. She had allegedly made a successful screen test winning over director Mark Robson and producer David Weisbart, the former already enthralled with her performance in You're a Big Boy Now. However, the following month, it was announced that Oscar-winner Patty Duke had signed on to play Neely, albeit against her agent's advice. Duke's over the top performance almost ruined her career.

Between the mid-1960s and early 1970s, Hartman appeared in three well-received films, two of which starred Broadway and Hollywood legend Geraldine Page, The Group (1966), You're a Big Boy Now (1966), and The Beguiled (1971). Portraying Pauline Mullins, the wife of former Sheriff Buford Pusser, she starred in the cult classic and major box office hit Walking Tall (1973). In 1975, Hartman starred in the premiere of Tom Rickman's play Balaam, a play about political intrigue in Washington, D.C. The production was mounted in Old Town Pasadena, California, by the Pasadena Repertory Theatre located in The Hotel Carver. It was directed by Hartman's husband, Gill Dennis. In 1981, she starred in a touring production of Morning's at Seven, but left the tour due to declining mental health. Her last on-screen performance was in 1981's horror-spoof, Full Moon High, where she appeared as Miss Montgomery. In 1982, she appeared in Don Bluth's The Secret of NIMH, where she portrayed the film's protagonist, Mrs. Brisby. She was highly praised for the performance; however, this proved to be her last Hollywood film role.

Later years and death
Throughout much of her life, Hartman suffered from depression. In 1978, she was treated at The Institute of Living in Hartford, Connecticut. In 1984, she divorced her husband, screenwriter Gill Dennis, after a five-year separation. In the last few years of her life, she gave up acting altogether and worked at a museum in Pittsburgh while receiving treatment for her condition at an outpatient clinic. In 1981, she returned to theater, portraying Myrtle Brown in a regional stage production of Morning's at Seven. Her sister and caretaker, Janet, told the Los Angeles Times:

"She was very suicidal...  As soon as I arrived, she took an overdose of sleeping pills and was rushed to intensive care. But, the next night, she appeared on stage and she was wonderful. I spent two weeks with her to try to get her to the theater every night. She was frightened of everyone and everything. We'd go to breakfast, and she'd get up and dash out as though somebody was after her".

On June 10, 1987, Hartman died after jumping from the window of her fifth floor apartment. Earlier that morning, she had reportedly called her psychiatrist saying that she felt despondent. Hartman was buried at Forest Lawn Memorial Park Cemetery in her hometown.

Initial newspaper reports of Hartman's suicide were vague, mainly because detectives were unable to identify the body; and because she had become a recluse years earlier, Hartman’s neighbors did not know for sure who she was, either.

Among the few friends who remained close from her Hollywood days were Francis Ford Coppola and Geraldine Page, both of whom continued to communicate with and support Hartman throughout her life and career. Page, who costarred with Hartman in two film productions, died of a heart attack on June 13, 1987. News of Hartman's suicide was published on page 28 of The New York Times on June 12, 1987.

Filmography

Film

Television

Stage credits

Accolades

See also 
 List of oldest and youngest Academy Award winners and nominees

References

Sources

External links 

 
 
 
 

1943 births
1987 deaths
20th-century American actresses
Actresses from Pittsburgh
Actresses from Youngstown, Ohio
American film actresses
American stage actresses
American voice actresses
Metro-Goldwyn-Mayer contract players
New Star of the Year (Actress) Golden Globe winners
Suicides by jumping in the United States
Suicides in Pennsylvania
People from Boardman, Ohio
1987 suicides
Female suicides